Muni (Sanskrit: मुनि, "silent") is a term for types of ancient Indian sages and hermits or ancient Indian ascetics.
Sages of this type are said to know the truth of existence not on the basis of scientific texts but through self-realization.

Buddhism 
In Buddhism the term "Muni" is used as a title of Gautama Buddha — who, being born among the tribe of the Shakyas, is called Śākyamuni (sage of the Shakyas). Various other titles like Munindra(Sanskrit; Pali: Muninda; meaning "lord of Munis"), Munivar(Greatest among Munis), Muniraj(King of Munis), Muniśvara(Sanskrit; Pali: Munissaro; meaning "god of Munis") Mahamuni(The greatest Muni) are also given to the Buddhas. The Mahamuni temple in Mandalay, Myanmar is named after the title of the Buddha.

Hinduism 
 In Rigveda the name mūni refers to a known Vedic Rishi who was prosperous beyond ritualistic orthodoxy, i.e., Brahmanism
 In a much later work, the Laghu-yoga-vasistha, mūnis are divided into two types:
 kaṣtha tapasvin - ascetics permanently residing in stillness
 Jivanmukta - those liberated for life in a physical body

See also 
 Keśin
 Sage (philosophy)
 Saint

References

External links

Titles and occupations in Hinduism
Gautama Buddha